DIVA Museum for Diamonds, Jewellery and Silver is a museum that opened in Antwerp, Belgium, in 2018. It merged the collections of the former Antwerp Diamond Museum (1972–2012) and Sterckshof silver museum (1992–2014) in a single institution.

The museum's collection "features over 500 objects that detail the story of Antwerp's history with diamonds and gemstones".

References

External links
 

Museums in Antwerp
Art museums and galleries in Belgium
2018 establishments in Belgium
Jewellery museums